Buhos is a rock group from Calafell in the comarca of Baix Penedès in Catalonia, Spain which was founded in 2005.

History

Early period (2007–2013)

After its founding in 2007, their first demo Rebelión was published on the street. The group gained popularity after a series of songs about FC Barcelona which they recorded for radio stations  and RAC 1. They also published satirical songs about current events for TV programs on Catalan TV station TV3. During this time, the band devoted a large part of its repertoire to covers, along with some original songs of their own.

Búhos musically celebrated soccer titles won by FC Barcelona, accompanied by Pep Guardiola in Plaça de Catalunya and in Barcelona's Arc de Triomf.

The Buhos made a compilation album in 2010 from all the demo tapes they recorded in their early period, which they called .

Later period (2014–present) 

In 2014, their later period began with a new line-up, and the release of their album  ("Wilderness") consisting of all original songs, which would become a hallmark of this period. With the release of this album, they began touring venues such as Clownia, Acampada Jove, or the annual La Mercè festival.

In March 2016, the album  ("Full Moon") went on sale and consolidated their position as one of the leading Catalan music groups.  They performed it at Clownia on Saint John's Eve and after a series of summer concerts, received Ràdio 4's Catalan Album of the Year Award and the 2016 Enderrock Award for best video for their  ("Barcelona lights up"). In December of that year, they performed the TV3 Christmas song of the year, entitled  ("Welcome Bells").

In 2018, the Buhos released  ("Living It Up"), the third album of their latter period. Weeks after the album was released they sold out the Razzmatazz in Barcelona, and the lead track of the album, "", became the 2018 song of the year by audience vote of the Enderrock audience.

In 2019 the group had its best tour ever, performing at all the top venues of the Catalan countries, including at least 70 concerts where they were headliners on top programs of Catalan music. In April 2019, the previously unpublished song "" came out.

Discography 

 Canciones para no dormir (2005)
F.C. Clandestinos
100 ventanas
Llámame
La suegra
Zumo sexual
Volverás
Lunes de miel
Rebelión en la plaza (2007)
La danza de la esperanza
Botellón
Agua
Pedrito el Cantante
Esta calor me está matando
Estoy quemado
Que tengas suerte
Rock and Roll
España (la fiesta de la especulación)
Los vecinos de este bar
La dansa de l'esperança (Bonus track)
Radio Buhos (2009)
Que es faci de nit
Nen dels 80
Muro de Gibraltar
Estic bé
Bailando en el infierno
Mileurista pobre desgraciado
El regidor
Cógelo
Birres
Salir a cazar
Messi
Gratis Hits (2010)
Dansa de l'esperança
Birres
Estoy quemao y no es del sol
Salir a cazar
El regidor
Los vecinos de este bar
Que es faci de nit
Mileurista pobre desgraciao
Botellón
Nen dels 80
L'eclipsi
Correfoc
Minut 92
Cau la nit (2012)
Festa Major
Quan cau la nit
Santuari on fire
Número 1
La meva inspiració
Petons de color verd
Aigua salada
El cambrer
La patrulla de l'alegria
Em deixo portar
La meva inspiració (digital)
Natura Salvatge (2014)    
 180° (feat. Els Catarres and )
 Brama  3. El Vaso (feat. )
 Toca Hamelin (feat. Pulpul of Ska-P)
 Volem guanyar
 Som una melodia (feat.  and Marcel "Tito" of Txarango)
 Chingao
 Res a les butxaques
 No serà etern
 Ales noves
 Sol naixent
Lluna Plena (2016)  
 La última y nos vamos
 El temporal
 Barcelona s'il·lumina
 Prenent la Lluna
 El cor m'apreta (feat. Esne Beltza)
 El soneto de Geppetto
 Mentides de plàstic (feat. )
 Mi vida es como un pogo
 Ens ballem aquesta nit
 Tornem al Penedès
 Birres
 Estoy quemao
La Gran Vida (2018)   
 Volcans 
La gran vida
 Escales fins al cel
 L'estiu és llibertat
 Transmets energia
 La bala del temps
 Els nostres tambors
 La trama
 Tu i jo som aire
 Cómplices del mal
 La darrera colònia
 Nos vamos pa'l festi
Connectats (2019)

See also 
 Music of Catalonia
 Catalan rumba
 Doctor Prats
 World music

References 

Musicians from Catalonia
People from Baix Penedès
Música Global artists